The Ukrainian Association of Football (UAF) is the governing body of football in Ukraine. Before 2019, it was known as the Football Federation of Ukraine (FFU). As a subject of the International Olympic Movement, UAF is a member of the National Olympic Committee of Ukraine. UAF is also member of international football organizations such as UEFA and FIFA.

Ukrainian Association of Football governs all sport events and organizations associated with the game of football including irregular competitions of beach football, mini-football, street football and others. Its main features include football competitions including the Ukrainian Professional League, the Ukrainian Cup, the Amatory, the competitions among the youth (under-18), and also the Ukraine national football team. It also sets the regulations to the Premier League and the Professional Football League.

It is headquartered in the national capital, Kyiv near the Olimpiyskiy National Sports Complex at the House of Football.

The organization was established in 1991. Between 1932-1991 with the Football Federation of the Soviet Union there existed its direct predecessor, Football Federation of Ukraine (Ukrainian SSR). The Soviet federation of Ukraine also conducted own championship, cup competitions, competitions among amateur teams (collectives of physical culture), as well as had own national team which participated exclusively in Soviet competitions such as the Spartakiad of Peoples of the USSR.

History

Organizations' names
 All-Ukrainian Football Union (1918)
 Football Section of the Ukrainian SSR (1932–1959)
 Football Federation of the Ukrainian SSR (1959–1991)
 Football Federation of Ukraine (1991–2019)
 Ukrainian Association of Football (since May 2019)

First steps in football sport administration
The first governing body was created in summer of 1918 in Kharkiv as All-Ukrainian Football Union by its constituent assembly. The chairman of the Union became V. Agiton, while a secreatary-treasurer – B. Shifrin.

After the Bolshevik's occupation, in 1932 there was created the All-Ukrainian Football Section in Kharkiv and was part of the Ukrainian Council of Physical Culture that administered all types of sports. The first elected president was a Kharkiv football referee Oleksandr Yakovych Levitin who published a book "Game rules of football in questions and answers". In 1934 after the capital of the Ukrainian SSR was transferred from Kharkiv to Kyiv, there was moved the Council of Physical Culture along with its football section. Levitin was replaced for not being not really a correct person with another Kharkiv football specialist Ivan Serhiyovych Kosmachov.

On 27 December 1934, on resolution of the All-Union Council of Physical Culture (VSFK) of the Soviet Union, there was established Football-Hockey section as the higher public organization in administration of football in the country and had to help the VSFK. During that period there started a struggle between people's commissariats and trade union for the right to lead the physical culture movement. Trade unions started actively create volunteer sports societies (the first were "Spartak" and "Lokomotiv"). However, already in 1936 took place big changes when the VSKF that existed at the Central Executive Committee of the Soviet Union was liquidated and instead at the Council of People's Commissariats (Sovnarkom) was created the All-Union Committee in affairs of Physical Culture and Sports (VKFK) which also contained a department of football and hockey as well as the public Football Section. In Ukraine was created the Ukrainian Committee in affairs of Physical Culture and Sports (UKFK) at the Ukrainian Council of People's Commissars and quartered in Kyiv. The committee supervised 15 oblasts committees along with the Committee of Moldavian ASSR quartered in Tiraspol.

At the end of February 1937, at the Ukrainian Committee in affairs of Physical Culture and Sports was established the Football-Hockey Section which in mass media was better known as Football Section. The head of the section was appointed Samuyil Izepilyovych Khavchyn. With the Nazi Germany invasion of the Soviet Union, all Soviet government institutions were evacuated or liquidated. The Football-Hockey Section was reinstated in 1944 and headed by Stepan Dmytrovych Romanenko. In 1946 the VKFK was renamed into the Goskomsport (State Committee in affairs of Physical Culture and Sports) and a similar analogy took place in the Ukrainian SSR. In 1946 there took place a huge event when the Football-Hockey Section of Goskomsport of the Soviet Union was finally admitted to FIFA. In 1947 the Football Section separated from the Football-Hockey Section. In 1953 the Goskomsport was transferred to the Ministry of Healthcare as the Main Administration of Physical Culture and Sports, but the next year was reinstated once again. Due to such rapid changes, almost none of union republic were able adopt them therefore no changes ever took place at republican level.

In 1954, the Football Section became a founding member of the Union of European Football Associations. Within the Goskomsport, the football department was renamed into the Football Administration. In 1955 to the presidium of Football Section from the Ukrainian SSR was admitted Mykola Balakin.

Football Federation of the Ukrainian SSR

Foundation in independent Ukraine
On 6 March 1991 due to the efforts of Viktor Maksymovych Bannikov was established and legally reformed the Football Federation of Ukraine (FFU) as part of the Football Federation of the Soviet Union (FFSU). However, it fully was still controlled and subordinated to the Moscow's main governing body.

On 24 August 1991 the Ukrainian parliament (Verkhovna Rada) by its Act of Declaration of Independence of Ukraine expressed its intent of casting away from Soviet Union and creation of a sovereign state – Ukraine. After these events the executive committee of Football Federation of the Ukrainian SSR made the decision to have a plenum in the beginning of December where the future of the growth of the national sport would be defined.

However, until then the following events took place that contribute to a certain degree of confusion.
 In the beginning of the September a joined conference of the governing body of the federation and the national football society took place where it was announces to establish internal institutes which would subordinate to Moscow.
 In October a meeting between Viktor Bannikov and the president UEFA, Lennart Johansson, took place. The president of the European football union promised to fully support Ukraine of joining the European football organization.
About the fact that on the world map appeared a new nation the world society realized on 1 December 1991 after the conduction of the All-national referendum.
After all that, on 13 December in the big hall of the State Committee of Physical Culture and Sport (also later known as Ministry in affairs of the Youth, Sport, and Tourism) the Council of federations in one voice accepted the following declaration:

13 December is the day when the Football Federation of Ukraine was established.

Some time at the end of February 1992 the Agence France-Presse spread information that the FIFA without waiting for its congress granted a status of provisional members to national federations of Ukraine, Georgia, Slovenia, and Croatia. According to its commentary, that was made in order for the associations of those four countries in advance build their relations with football unions of other countries, and their footballers participate in friendlies of national team levels. Soon at address of the Football Federation of Ukraine arrived relevant official documents not only from FIFA, but from UEFA that were signed by general secretaries of those organizations, Sepp Blatter and Gerhard Aigner. In his interview in that regard the FFU first president Viktor Bannikov noted, "The relate to the powers of our federation on implementing of all transferring rights and participation of national and club teams in international competitions. Questions about such powers were placed before the relevant authorities during my stay in Zurich in mid February. On 24 February we sent a request to the FIFA asking for an answer. The returning fax did not make us wait long."

On 16 February 1992 there kicked off the 1992 Ukrainian Cup which became the first football tournament among professional teams since Ukraine revived its independence. The first round of the 1992 Higher League was scheduled on 6–7 March 1992. On 29 April 1992 the FFU scheduled its first international friendly with the Hungary national football team.

The head coach of the national team was originally planned to appoint Valeriy Lobanovskyi, who at that time headed the UAE national football team. Viktor Bannikov did not fail to inform that to the shores of Persian Gulf was sent an invitation on the address of the Maître of domestic coaching corps, and Lobanovskyi gave a prior agreement. But he will be ready to lead the Ukraine national football team only at the end of the term of current contract, to which at that tie remained about a month. Thereby the first coach of national team had to be picked from the members of coaching council that included Anatoliy Puzach (Dynamo), Yevhen Kucherevskyi (Dnipro), Yevhen Lemeshko (Torpedo), Yukhym Shkolnykov (Bukovyna), Viktor Prokopenko (Chornomorets), and somewhat later they were joined by Valeriy Yaremcheko (Shakhtar).

As mentioned by Yevhen Kotelnykov (vice-president at that time), the Ukrainian diaspora played a key role in helping the federation and the national team in particular from very beginning. It was diaspora that made possible for the national to play games in the United States.

In 1992 the FFU delegation received an invitation to participate in the 48th FIFA Congress that was scheduled to take place in Zurich in the beginning of July. At that forum in particular was to be reviewed an issue of accepting Ukraine and some other newly created countries as permanent members of the International federation. The relevant documents were already reviewed in the FIFA headquarters and approved with minor remarks on some four points. Sometime later arrived a personal invitation for Viktor Bannikov to participate in extraordinary session of the UEFA Executive Committee along with the Committee on conducting continental tournaments. It was about granting our country a possibility already in the next season to present one team in each of Eurocups subject to the terms presented by the European Union, creation of own league, availability of appropriate infrastructure to hold games of such levels, ensuring security while they are being held.

In his turn the FFU president offered the International federation not to grant Russia a right automatically inherit the place of CIS national football team in qualification cycle of the 1994 FIFA World Cup and hold an additional tournament between national teams of former Soviet republics for the place in already formed during a draw the Group 5. The proposal was supported by Georgia and Armenia, but from Russians it caused an extremely negative reaction. For example, the RFU general secretary Vladimir Radionov accused the Ukrainian federation in scheming and regarded the idea of such tournament as a legally unreasonable attempt "run ahead of a locomotive". At the same time those neighbors of Ukraine were convinced that rights of former Union federation must be transferred to them. As the result, so it happened, although until the last moment, particularly the FIFA Executive Committee meeting in Stockholm and the congress, Viktor Bannikov tried to stand his ground.

In 1995 new elections took place at the 2nd conference and against Bannikov ran former goalkeeper Hennadiy Lysenchuk, but he lost.

Presidents
 Viktor Bannikov (December 1991 – August 1996)
 Valeriy Pustovoytenko (August 1996 – August 2000), Prime Minister of Ukraine from 16 July 1997 to 30 November 1999
 Hryhoriy Surkis (16 August 2000 – 2 September 2012), reelected in 2004 and 2007
 Anatoliy Konkov (2 September 2012 – 22 January 2015)
 Andriy Pavelko (22 January 2015 – present), elected on 6 March 2015

First vice-presidents
 Yevhen Kotelnykov
 Serhiy Storozhenko
 Anatoliy Bidenko
 Oleksandr Bandurko
 Vadym Kostyuchenko
 Ihor Kochetov
 Nazar Kholodnytskyi

Executive Committee

Viktor Andrukhiv
Viktor Bezsmertny
Andriy Bondarenko
Sergiy Vladyko
Irek Hataullin
Taras Herula

Structure

Main governing institutions
The main decisions of all-national importance are discussed at the meetings of the Congress of Football Federation of Ukraine (FFU). Congress also elects the president and vice-presidents (presidential cabinet) of federation and confirms several football government bodies such as presidium, executive committee, appellation committee, and others. The congress is more of a legislative body of government and sets goals and directions for the development of football in the country. All official meetings of various football government institutions take place at the "Building of Football" (Budynok futbolu) in Kyiv.

All structural and organizational issues are executed by the Executive Committee (Vykonkom). The executive committee consists of about 30 people and includes the presidential cabinet of federation. To assist the executive committee there exists a presidium which organizes the meetings of the Vykonkom. The presidium composed of 16 people, among which are all the members of the presidential cabinet as well.

Committees and collective members
The federation also has two judicial bodies of government: the control disciplinary committee (KDK) and the appellation committee. Those are small committees and are confirmed by the congress of Football Federation of Ukraine.

Aside of the above-mentioned organizations there are numerous other committees and directorates that supplement in the organization of football events in Ukraine. Among the most important are the Committee of professional football, the Committee of national teams, the Committee of referees, the Expert Commission, the Council of a strategic development of professional football, and many others.

There are also collective members of federation that include various public organizations such as regional federation, student associations, independent leagues, travel agencies, others. The importance of collective members is that every single one of them can delegate up to three its representatives to the Congress and announce its own candidates on the position of the president.

Collective members
 Premier League of Ukraine
 Professional Football League of Ukraine
 Ukrainian Football Amateur Association (National championship among the regions, National cup)
 Association of football veterans
 Association of mini-football of Ukraine (Futsal)
 Association of beach football of Ukraine
 Football association of handicapped
 27 regional football federations
 All-Ukrainian football association of students
 Children-Youth football league of Ukraine (Ukrainian National Youth Competition)
 League of Street Football
 Youth Football Union
 Committee of fitness education and sports of Ministry of Education
 Sports office of Ministry of Defense (CSK ZSU)
 Central Council of Sports Club "Spartak" of Trade-unions of Ukraine
 Central Council of Fitness Sports Club of Ukraine "Dynamo"
 Central Council of Fitness Sports Club of Ukraine "Kolos"
 Central Council of Fitness Sports Club "Ukraine"
 Association "Futbol-Zakhid"
 Association of referees of Ukraine
 Ukraina Football International
 Tourist agency "Sport Line Travel"
 Public association "Hrayemo za Ukrainu razom" (Play for Ukraine together)

Associative members
 Association of Women Football (Ukrainian Women's League, WFPL)

Congresses
The list of recent congress meetings. Congresses take place every year. Each FFU collective member sends three delegates.

Fighting corruption 
After German weekly news magazine "Der Spiegel" published its investigation titled "How did the UEFA payments get to the British Virgin Islands?" the UAF addressed the State Bureau of Investigations, Prosecutor General's Office and the Internal Ministry of Ukraine filing a claim that Hryhorii Surkis, former president of the Football Federation of Ukraine, has committed a criminal offence stealing hundreds of millions Euro.

According to "Der Spiegel", starting from 1999 (that is for almost 15 years) the UEFA has been transferring the money (in general  €380 million) allocated for the Football Federation (now Ukrainian Association of Football) to Newport management Ltd. – an offshore entity.

This company is registered in the British Virgin Islands and, according to the publication, is controlled by Hryhorii Surkis, who had been chairing the FFU from  2000 till 2012, and who's been a member of the UEFA executive committee for more than 10 years until February 2019).

National teams
Ukraine national football team
Ukraine women's national football team
Ukraine national under-21 football team (also known as the youth team, participates in qualifications for the Olympic tournament)
Ukraine youth women national football team (under 19)
Ukraine student football team
Other national and junior football teams
National team tournaments
Valeri Lobanovsky Memorial Tournament
Viktor Bannikov Memorial Tournament
Others

Russian invasion 2022 
The Association announced the suspension of Ukraine's first league in February 24, 2022, the day of Russia's invasion of Ukraine.

See also
Regional football federations of Ukraine
FFU Committee of Referees

References

Further reading
Quick overview (in Russian) – co-memorated to the first match of the national team.
 Andriyuk, K. Is everything in the today's FFU so ProZorro-transparent? (Чи все в нинішньому ФФУ так ProZorro?). Football 24. 22 June 2017
 Voronyuk, S. FFU: Greetings from the Otherworld (ФФУ: Привет из потустороннего мира). Futbolnyi klub (by Sport-Ekspress in Ukraine). 11 July 2014

External links
Football Federation of Ukraine – official website
 Ukraine at FIFA site
 Ukraine at UEFA site

 

Ukraine
Football
Sports organizations established in 1991
1991 establishments in Ukraine
Futsal in Ukraine
Collective members of the National Olympic Committee of Ukraine